Joseph William Kelly Jr. (born June 9, 1988) is an American professional baseball pitcher for the Chicago White Sox of Major League Baseball (MLB). He has previously played in MLB for the St. Louis Cardinals, Boston Red Sox and Los Angeles Dodgers. He played college baseball for the UC Riverside Highlanders. He has served as both a starter and a reliever. The Cardinals drafted Kelly in the third round of the 2009 MLB draft.

Kelly has gained publicity for his comical repertoire, such as dancing in the outfield during practice, disguising himself while interviewing the unwitting rapper Nelly, engaging in a lengthy staredown with Los Angeles Dodgers outfielder Scott Van Slyke before a 2013 National League Championship Series game, and wearing a charro jacket to the White House. In 2020, Kelly’s mocking of Carlos Correa complaining about a near hit by pitch became popular online.

Early life and amateur career
Kelly is the son of former NFL player, Joseph Kelly Sr., who spent his college career at Vanderbilt University and played professionally for the then San Diego Chargers. Kelly was born in Anaheim, California, and attended Corona High School in Corona, California. After high school, he attended the University of California, Riverside (UCR), and played college baseball for the Highlanders team. An outfielder in high school, he converted to pitcher in college and served as the closer. He was named Big West Conference Pitcher of the Year in 2007 as a freshman. After his sophomore season in 2008, he played collegiate summer baseball for the Yarmouth–Dennis Red Sox of the Cape Cod Baseball League. In 2009, Kelly posted a 5.65 earned run average (ERA) with a 1–1 win–loss record. Kelly set a Highlanders record with 24 career saves and was named an All-American. His final career stats at UCR included a 4.65 ERA and an 8–11 record in 42 career games.

Professional career

Minor leagues (2009–2012)
The St. Louis Cardinals selected Kelly in the third round of the 2009 MLB draft and signed him on June 15 for $341,000. Kelly made his professional baseball debut with the Batavia Muckdogs of the Class A Short Season New York–Penn League, where he appeared in 16 games (two starts), posting a 4.75 ERA with 30 strikeouts in  innings pitched.

In 2010, the Cardinals mainly used Kelly as a starting pitcher with the Class A Quad Cities River Bandits to get him more innings and develop his secondary pitches. He succeeded in the role and remained a starter. For the season, Kelly appeared in 26 games (18 starts) and pitched  innings while registering 92 strikeouts and 45 walks with a 4.62 ERA and 6–8 record.

In 2011, Kelly pitched for the Class A-Advanced Palm Beach Cardinals of the Florida State League and then the Double-A Springfield Cardinals of the Texas League. Combined, Kelly appeared in 23 games (22 starts) and pitched 132 innings, recording 113 strikeouts and 59 walks with an 11–6 record and 3.68 ERA. In 2012, with the Triple-A Memphis Redbirds, he posted a 2.86 ERA in 12 games (all starts).

St. Louis Cardinals (2012–2014)

2012

Kelly made his MLB debut on June 10, replacing the injured Jaime García in the Cardinals' starting rotation. Kelly pitched seven innings in his MLB debut, against the Cleveland Indians, allowing seven hits and one run while striking out four batters; he received a no decision in the game. Once García returned to the rotation, Kelly moved to a bullpen role; however, he impressed team officials so much they considered keeping him in the rotation and moving Lance Lynn to the bullpen. Overall for the 2012 Cardinals, Kelly appeared in 24 games (16 starts) while compiling a 5–7 record, with a 3.53 ERA and 75 strikeouts in 107 innings pitched.

Kelly's first MLB postseason series was the 2012 National League Division Series, against the Washington Nationals. He appeared in three games and pitched  innings of relief without giving up a run or a hit; he walked one batter and struck out three batters. The Cardinals then advanced to the 2012 NLCS against the San Francisco Giants. In the deciding Game 7, Kelly came on to pitch in the third inning with the Giants ahead 2–0 with the bases loaded and no outs; he gave up two hits and two walks, lasting just  of an inning, and exited with the Giants ahead 7–0, in a game they would go on to win 9–0. Overall, Kelly made four appearances in the series, pitching a total of four innings in relief; he gave up six hits and was charged with two earned runs, while walking three batters and striking out two batters.

2013
After spring training in 2013, Kelly lost his rotation spot to rookie Shelby Miller and was relegated to the bullpen for much of the first half of the season, seeing little use. However, he became known somewhat as a "stopper" after being reinserted into the rotation to increase its effectiveness. In August, Kelly went 5–0 with a 2.08 ERA. He stranded 83.3% of baserunners as a reliever, and 82% as a starter. He won all three of his starts against the Pittsburgh Pirates, who finished the season three games behind the Cardinals. During the 2013 Cardinals regular season, Kelly had 37 appearances (15 starts), registering a 10–5 record and 2.69 ERA, with 79 strikeouts in 124 innings pitched.

Against the Milwaukee Brewers on September 22, Kelly showcased some of his speed he utilized as a former center fielder when Brewer Carlos Gómez was caught in a rundown between third base and home plate. Gómez, a speedy center fielder himself with 37 stolen bases at the time, was attempting to run back to third base when Kelly took the throw and sprinted after him. Kelly caught up with Gómez, dove, and tagged him out just steps away from the bag.

On October 6, Kelly made his first postseason start against the Pirates in the 2013 National League Division Series, receiving a no decision in Game 3. He had the same result in Game 1 of the NLCS, followed by a loss to the Los Angeles Dodgers in Game 5.

In Game 6, Kelly and Dodgers outfielder Scott Van Slyke created a stir before the first pitch by engaging in a lengthy staredown. Both men remained on the field after the conclusion of "The Star-Spangled Banner," long after the rest of their teammates departed the field to await the start of the game. They maintained their positions with hats over their chests through the ground crew's preparation of the field and starting pitcher Michael Wacha's warmup pitches. A total of about 15 minutes passed before the annoyed home plate umpire, Greg Gibson, motioned to both players. Both claimed "victory", as Kelly had smiled first, and Van Slyke had first moved from his position.

Kelly made his first World Series start in Game 3, against the Boston Red Sox. He received a no decision in a 5–4 Cardinals win, pitching  innings while allowing two hits and two runs, striking out six batters and walking three batters. The Cardinals lost the series in six games.

2014
Kelly won his 2014 debut on April 5 after the Cardinals defeated the Pirates, 6–1, despite allowing 10 base runners in  innings. He also doubled off opposing starter Francisco Liriano for his first hit of the season. He spent most of the first half on the disabled list, but rehabbed in Triple-A Memphis and was activated to face the Milwaukee Brewers on July 11.

He gave up six earned runs in his return, but got a no decision when Matt Holliday, Jhonny Peralta, Kolten Wong, and Matt Adams all homered to give the Cardinals a comeback win. His next start, on July 19 against the Dodgers, was a dominant seven-inning performance that tied his longest career outing. During the 2014 season, Kelly appeared in seven games (all starts) for the Cardinals, pitching 35 innings and compiling a 2–2 record with 4.37 ERA prior to his trade to Boston at the end of July.

Overall, in parts of three seasons with St. Louis, Kelly compiled a 17–14 record with 3.25 ERA and 179 strikeouts over 266 innings pitched in 68 games (38 starts).

Boston Red Sox (2014–2018)

2014
On July 31, 2014, Kelly was traded to the Boston Red Sox along with first baseman/outfielder Allen Craig for starting pitcher John Lackey and minor league pitcher Corey Littrell. In ten starts for Boston, during August and September, Kelly went 4–2 with a 4.11 ERA while striking out 41 and allowing 32 walks in  innings.

2015
In January 2015, Kelly made a guarantee to the Boston media that he would win the AL Cy Young Award the following season. He began the 2015 season on the disabled list. Through his first 15 starts, he suffered through his worst season in the majors, going 2–6 with a 5.74 ERA. He had led all major league pitchers with four errors through July 27. However, in an August resurgence, he won all six starts, including a 3–1 win over the New York Mets on August 29, making him the first Red Sox pitcher since Pedro Martínez to record six wins in one month. He lowered his ERA to 4.94 in August. Kelly was shut down after September 15 due to injury. He finished the season 10–6 in 25 starts for the season with a 4.82 ERA.

2016

Early in the 2016 season, the Red Sox placed Kelly on the disabled list on April 20 with a right shoulder impingement. In his return on May 21, he took a no-hitter through  innings against the Cleveland Indians until Juan Uribe broke it up with a double; Boston won, 9–1. However, Kelly pitched only  and  innings in his next two starts. By the end of the 2016 season, after spending time with the Triple-A Pawtucket Red Sox, Kelly's role with Boston was as a relief pitcher. He ended the 2016 regular season with 20 MLB appearances (six starts) with an ERA of 5.18 and a record of 4–0.

In his new relief role, Kelly made three appearances in the 2016 American League Division Series. He pitched a total of  innings, retiring all 11 batters he faced including three strikeouts, as the Red Sox were swept by the Cleveland Indians.

2017
For the 2017 season, Kelly continued his role as a member of the Red Sox bullpen. During the regular season he made 54 appearances, all in relief, compiling a 2.79 ERA with 4–1 record in 58 innings pitched; he had 52 strikeouts and issued 27 walks. His fastest pitch of 2017 was 102.2 miles per hour, third-best in MLB only to pitches by Aroldis Chapman and Felipe Vázquez. His two-seam and four-seam fastballs had the second-and third-highest average speeds of any MLB pitcher's pitches in 2017, at 98.9 mph.

In the 2017 American League Division Series, Kelly pitched in two of the series' four games, allowing no walks and four hits with one strikeout in  innings of scoreless relief, as the Red Sox lost to the eventual World Series winner, the Houston Astros.

2018
Early in the 2018 season, in an April 11 game against the New York Yankees at Fenway Park, Kelly hit Tyler Austin with a pitch, following a slide by Austin in which he was accused of spiking infielder Brock Holt. Austin charged Kelly and started a bench-clearing brawl; four players, including Kelly, were ejected. This was Kelly's first career ejection. On April 12, Kelly was suspended by MLB for six games and fined an undisclosed amount; he subsequently appealed, allowing him to continue playing until the appeal process completed. On April 26, Kelly's appeal was denied, meaning that his suspension would take effect from that point on. During his suspension, Kelly watched a game from the bleacher seats at Fenway Park. He appeared in a career high 73 games for the Red Sox, finishing with a 4.39 ERA in  innings. In the postseason, Kelly made nine appearances, pitching  innings while allowing one earned run and striking out 13. He was the winning pitcher, in relief, of Game 4 of the World Series, as the Red Sox defeated the Los Angeles Dodgers in five games.

Los Angeles Dodgers (2019–2021)
On December 21, 2018, Kelly signed a three-year, $27 million, contract with the Los Angeles Dodgers. The contract included a $12 million option for a fourth year. Kelly struggled in the early part of the season for the Dodgers and had an 8.35 ERA on June 1, causing him to be booed by the homefield fans. However, after tweaking his delivery he became one of the team's primary bullpen weapons the rest of the season, posting a 3.15 ERA in the second half of the season.

He finished 2019 with a 5–4 record and one save, and a 4.56 ERA in 55 relief appearances, in which he struck out 62 batters in  innings. In Game 5 of the National League Division Series, Kelly gave up a 10th inning grand slam to Howie Kendrick, and was tagged with the loss.

On July 29, 2020, Kelly was issued an eight-game suspension after throwing at Alex Bregman and Carlos Correa of the Houston Astros and inciting a bench clearing altercation after a strikeout of Correa. He appeared in 12 games in the pandemic shortened 2020 season and allowed two earned runs in 10 innings. He appeared in five games in the postseason, including two in the 2020 World Series against the Tampa Bay Rays. He allowed only one run in  innings as the Dodgers won the championship.

In 2021, Kelly pitched in 48 games for the Dodgers with a 2.86 ERA, two saves and 50 strikeouts in 44 innings. In the postseason, he pitched  innings over seven games through the Wild Card Game, NLDS and NLCS, allowing three runs on five hits. While appearing as an opener in Game 5 of the NLCS, he suffered a right biceps strain that shut him down for the rest of the playoffs. On November 6, 2021, the Dodgers declined the 2022 option on Kelly, making him a free agent.

Chicago White Sox
On March 14, 2022, Kelly signed a two-year, $17 million contract with a club option for the 2024 season with the Chicago White Sox. Kelly began the season on the injured list still recovering from the biceps strain. On May 9, Kelly was activated from the IL. On that same day, he made his White Sox debut against the Cleveland Guardians in the 7th inning going 1 inning while allowing 2 hits and striking out Franmil Reyes for his first White Sox strikeout. Kelly struggled in his first year with the White Sox. Kelly in 2022 went 1–3 with a career worst ERA of 6.08 in 43 games in 37 innings while striking out 53 batters.

Pitching profile
He also throws a changeup to left-handed batters and a curveball. His control of his pitches — including his fastball — receives compliments.

Awards
Minor leagues
 Florida State League All-Star, mid-season, 2011
 The Cardinal Nation/Scout.com Top Prospect 2011 #27
 Midwest League Pitcher of the Week: July 26 – August 2, 2010
 The Cardinal Nation/Scout.com Top Cardinals Prospect 2010: #32
International
 Silver medal, United States, Pan American Games, 2007
College
 Big West Conference Pitcher of the Year, 2009
 Preseason All-American Third Team, 2009
 Big West Conference Pitcher of the Year, 2007

Personal life
Joe Kelly married Ashley Parks, daughter of former Minnesota Twins catcher Derek Parks, in November 2013. Kelly shared a condominium, for a time, with Shelby Miller, with whom he competed for a rotation spot during spring training 2013. Kelly met his wife while attending UCR. Kelly also has a son and a set of twins. He and his family reside in Rancho Cucamonga, California.

Kelly has showcased his jocular side on occasions besides the 2013 NLCS. While rapper Nelly, a self-professed Cardinals fan and "unofficial mayor" of St. Louis, interviewed with Fox Sports Midwest's Jim Hayes before a game in 2013 featuring his bobblehead giveaway, Hayes welcomed "an older member of the Cardinals organization" to participate. This older member was Kelly wearing a mask of a bald, elderly man. Nelly never guessed it was a prank until Kelly revealed himself after the interview.

Kelly's mother, Andrea Valencia, is Mexican-American. Earlier in the 2013 season, Kelly was spotted dancing salsa in the outfield. He attributed this urge to dance salsa to moves his mother taught him after urging him to take lessons when he was a child. Kelly notably wore a charro jacket in celebration of his Mexican heritage to the Dodgers’ championship trip to the White House following the 2020 season, trending on the internet as a meme and leading multiple fans to sell photoshopped pictures of Kelly in front of the Tapatio logo.

Kelly grew up an Angels fan.

References

Further reading
  (video)
  (video)

External links

1988 births
Living people
American people of Irish descent
American baseball players of Mexican descent
Baseball players at the 2007 Pan American Games
Baseball players from Anaheim, California
Batavia Muckdogs players
Boston Red Sox players
Chicago White Sox players
Los Angeles Dodgers players
Major League Baseball pitchers
Medalists at the 2007 Pan American Games
Memphis Redbirds players
Palm Beach Cardinals players
Pan American Games medalists in baseball
Pan American Games silver medalists for the United States
Quad Cities River Bandits players
Rancho Cucamonga Quakes players
Springfield Cardinals players
St. Louis Cardinals players
UC Riverside Highlanders baseball players
United States national baseball team players
Yarmouth–Dennis Red Sox players